Soupy Norman is an eight-part Irish-Polish television programme broadcast by RTÉ. It aired weekly on Thursday nights at 23:05 on the RTÉ Two channel, in ten-minute segments. The series ran from May to December 2007. The show is a comedic re-dubbing of the Polish soap opera Pierwsza miłość (First Love), which has been running on Polsat television since 2004.

The series is written and edited by Barry Murphy and Mark Doherty, with additional voices provided by Tara Flynn, Sue Collins, Luke Murphy and Mario Rosenstock. Where the original soap opera dealt with a girl leaving her family behind to go to college, the re-dubbed version of the programme explores the culture shock of a dysfunctional family from Cork in Dublin. The series' surreal humour led to a cult following, with its episodes being popular on YouTube.

A special episode entitled "The Late Late Soupy Norman Tribute" which featured dubbed clips from RTÉ's The Late Late Show as well as clips from previous episodes of Soupy Norman as well as including a new scene of the show. This was broadcast on Christmas Eve 2007.

A pilot sketch for the series initially aired on Armando Iannucci's show Time Trumpet on BBC 2, of which this show was a spin-off.

Plot
The main story of the show concerns Esther, a Polish-Irish teenager from Buttevant, County Cork, who travels up to Dublin to study in college. There she encounters strong discrimination, for being a "culchie". She lives with Susan Costigan (or Gleeson, depending on the episode), described by Esther as "a woman with red hair", her daughter Kylie, her son Nathan (who becomes possessed by voices in the episode "Omen"), and her husband Declan. Kylie becomes Esther's friend, and they are seen stealing items (such as a dog) in the episode "Margarita".

The series' other main characters are Esther's father, named Jack, and her Grandad, known to Jack as "Daddy", who live in Buttevant. She has a sister, who is unseen throughout the series, who Jack mentions a few times ("I have two daughters – two of them – and one of them's a boy"). Grandad is an extreme authority figure, as seen in the first episode "Buttevant", often sending Jack to the "bold chair" if he disobeys him in any way. He constantly berates Jack, calling him a "great big disappointment". The two of them are mostly seen drinking vinegar (Jack thinking it was whisky), and being visited by Soupy Norman, the title character.

Soupy is always extremely aggressive and inebriated, and is only ever seen stumbling into the pair's house, delivering rambling, nonsensical rantings to the two men, always trying to punch Jack. In one episode, he asks to marry Esther's sister. He refers to Esther as "that culchie bitch". The Soupy Norman sequences are always taken from the same scene from First Love, and are repeated every episode.

The series has a subplot of Sean, a Dublin youth, trying to make a living in the city. He does this by applying for increasingly strange jobs, such as a builder, walking a dog with "canine leg disorder", running the "Red Car Bar" nightclub, and helping Satanic spirits in the episode "Omen" (a reference to the film The Omen.)

In the final episode, "Straz", a character called Soupy Dave (who is sometimes seen throughout the series trying to sell Jack and Grandad shady goods such as prawns and whale meat) is contracted by Jack's estranged wife (rarely seen before this episode) to kill him, using a number of surreal techniques.

Episodes

Legacy
Although unsuccessful on its initial broadcast, Soupy Norman acquired a following online and is now considered a cult classic, with a 2018 article on RTÉ's website naming it the third greatest Irish sitcom of all time, with the Rubberbandits commenting "To this day I've no idea how RTE let something that good on TV".

References

External links
 Soupy Norman official site (Web Archive)
 The original sketch on Youtube
 Soupy Norman on Bebo (Web Archive)
 Review of the series

2007 Irish television series debuts
2007 Polish television series debuts
Parody television series
Irish comedy-drama television series
Polish comedy-drama television series
2000s comedy-drama television series
RTÉ original programming
2007 Irish television series endings
2007 Polish television series endings
2000s Polish television series
Irish people of Polish descent